Gilfach Fargoed railway station is a railway station serving the village of Gilfach, in Caerphilly county borough, south Wales. It is a stop on the Rhymney Line of the Valley Lines network.

The platforms are short and can barely accommodate a British Rail Class 153 train, due to its small size it is affectionately nicknamed "Gilfach International". Passengers can only alight from the front doors of any train calling here, so the conductor on longer trains must give passengers advance notice so that they have time to move towards the front set of doors.

History
Built as a halt by the Rhymney Railway in 1908 for recently introduced steam railmotors, some 50 years after the line first opened. Although very close, the halt did not serve the Brecon and Merthyr Railway which passed behind, on its way to Bargoed south Junction.

Services
Mondays to Saturdays there is an hourly  service between Bargoed and Penarth.

Due to the platforms not being long enough to accommodate social distancing measures introduced because of the COVID-19 pandemic, the station was temporarily closed between 6 July 2020 and 21 August 2021.

References

External links

Video coverage and history of Gilfach Fargoed Station

Railway stations in Caerphilly County Borough
DfT Category F2 stations
Former Rhymney Railway stations
Railway stations in Great Britain opened in 1908
Railway stations served by Transport for Wales Rail
1908 establishments in Wales